Ottis Dewey Whitman Jr. (January 20, 1923 – June 19, 2013), known as Slim Whitman, was an American country music singer-songwriter and guitarist known for his yodeling abilities and his use of falsetto. He claimed he had sold in excess of 120 million records, although the recorded sales figures give 70 million, during a career that spanned over seven decades, and consisted of a prolific output of over 100 albums and around 500 recorded songs, that not only consisted of country music, but also of contemporary gospel, Broadway show tunes, love songs and standards. In the 1950s, Whitman toured with Elvis Presley as the opening act. 

In the 1990s and 2000s, a new generation was exposed to Whitman through his songs featured in the film Mars Attacks!. His "Indian Love Call" (listened to by the elderly character played by veteran actress Sylvia Sidney) would kill the invading Martians by causing their heads to explode every time the record was played. This proves the key to defeating the otherwise seemingly invincible invaders. Whitman's rendition of "I Remember You" was heard in Rob Zombie's House of 1000 Corpses.

Biography

Ottis Dewey Whitman Jr. was born in the Oak Park neighborhood of Tampa, Florida on January 20, 1923, one of six siblings, born to Ottis Dewey Whitman (1896–1961) and Lucy Whitman ( Mahon; 1903–1987). 

Growing up, he liked the country music of Jimmie Rodgers and the songs of Gene Autry, but he did not embark on a musical career of his own until the end of World War II after he had served in the South Pacific with the United States Navy. While aboard ship, he sang and entertained members on board. This resulted in the captain blocking his transfer to another ship—hence saving his life, as the other ship later sank with all hands lost. Whitman's early ambitions were to become either a boxer or a professional baseball player.

Career

Early career
Whitman was a self-taught left-handed guitarist, although he was right-handed. He had lost almost all of the second finger on his left hand in an accident while working at a meat packing plant. He worked odd jobs at a Tampa shipyard while developing a musical career, eventually performing with bands such as the Variety Rhythm Boys and the Light Crust Doughboys. He was briefly nicknamed The Smiling Starduster after a stint with a group called The Stardusters. Whitman's first big break came when talent manager "Colonel" Tom Parker heard him singing on the radio and offered to represent him. After signing with RCA Records, he was billed as "the cowboy singer Slim Whitman", after Canadian singer Wilf Carter, who was known in the United States as Montana Slim. Whitman released his first single in 1948, "I'm Casting My Lasso Towards the Sky", complete with yodel. He toured and sang in a variety of venues, including the radio show Louisiana Hayride.

Initially he was unable to make a living from music, and he kept a part-time job at a post office. That changed in the early 1950s after he recorded a version of the Bob Nolan hit "Love Song of the Waterfall", which made it into the country music top 10. His next single, "Indian Love Call", taken from the light operetta Rose-Marie, was even more successful, reaching number two in the country music charts and appearing in the US pop music chart's top ten.

Hit recordings
A yodeller, Whitman avoided country music's "down on yer luck, buried in booze" songs, preferring instead to sing laid-back romantic melodies about simple life and love. Critics dubbed his style "countrypolitan", owing to its fusion of country music and a more sophisticated crooning vocal style. Although he recorded many country and western tunes, including hits "Tumbling Tumbleweeds", "Singing Hills", and "The Cattle Call", love and romance songs like "Serenade", "Something Beautiful (to Remember)", and "Keep It a Secret" figured prominently in his repertoire.

Rose Marie, Red River Valley, and Home on the Range
In 1955, he would have a No. 1 hit on the pop music charts in the United Kingdom with the theme song to the operetta Rose-Marie. With nineteen weeks in the charts and eleven weeks at the top of the UK Singles Chart, the song set a record that lasted for 36 years. In 1956 he became the first-ever country music singer to perform at the London Palladium. Soon after, Whitman was invited to join the Grand Ole Opry, and in 1957, along with other musical stars, he appeared in the film musical Jamboree. Despite this exposure, he never achieved the level of stardom in the United States that he did in Britain, where he had a number of other hits during the 1950s. 

Throughout the early 1970s, he continued to record and was a guest on Wolfman Jack's television show The Midnight Special. At the time, Whitman's recording efforts were yielding only minor hits in the US. The mid-1970s were a successful time for Whitman in the UK Albums Chart. In 1976, the compilation album The Very Best of Slim Whitman was number one for six weeks, staying 17 weeks on the chart. Another number one album followed in 1977 with Red River Valley: four weeks at number one and 14 weeks on the chart. Later the same year, his album Home on the Range made number 2 on the chart and accumulated a chart stay of 13 weeks.

In 1979, Whitman produced a TV commercial to support Suffolk Marketing's release of a greatest hits compilation titled All My Best, which was the second best-selling TV-marketed record in music history (behind Peter Lemongello’s Love ‘76 three years earlier), with almost 1.5 million units sold. Just for You, also under the Suffolk umbrella, followed in 1980, with a commercial that said Whitman "was number one in England longer than Elvis and The Beatles." The Best followed in 1982, with Whitman concluding his TV marketing with Best Loved Favorites in 1989 and 20 Precious Memories in 1991. Twilight on the Trail, his final release, appeared in 2010, 55 years after his first.

Slim was voted Best International Male Vocalist at The International Country Music Awards in 1976, 1977, 1978 and 1979.

In 1982, Whitman's 20 Golden Greats was certified platinum in Australia.

TV marketing
The TV albums briefly made Whitman a household name in America for the first time in his career, resulting in everything from a first-time appearance on The Tonight Show starring Johnny Carson to Whitman being parodied in a comic skit on SCTV with him (played by Joe Flaherty) starring in the Che-like male lead in an Evita-like Broadway musical on the life of Indira Gandhi. More importantly, the TV albums gave him a brief resurgence in mainstream country music with new album releases on major labels and a few new singles on the country charts. During this time, he toured Europe and Australia with moderate success.

Popularity in Europe
Although once known as "America's Favorite Folk Singer", he was consistently more popular throughout Europe, and in particular the United Kingdom, than in his native America, especially with his covers of pop standards, film songs, love songs, folk tunes, and gospel hymns. 

His 1955 hit single "Rose Marie" spent 11 weeks at #1 on the UK Singles Chart and held the Guinness World Record for the longest consecutive number of weeks at number one on the UK Singles Chart for 36 years until Bryan Adams broke the record in 1991 and was listed in British Hit Singles & Albums. In the U.S., his "Indian Love Call" (1952) and a reworking of the Doris Day hit "Secret Love" (1953) both reached No. 2 on the Billboard country chart. 

Whitman had a string of top 10 hits from the mid-1960s and into the 1970s and became known to a new generation of fans through television marketing in the 1980s. Throughout the 1990s and into the 21st century, he continued to tour extensively around the world and after several years of non-studio recording, produced the album (his final recording) Twilight on the Trail, released in 2010.

Later recordings
Angeline, Whitman's last album under contract, was released in 1984, after which he continued to tour. His last performance in the UK was at Norwich in October 2002 and in the U.S. in September or October 2003.

In 1988 or 1990, a joint album with Whitman's son Byron, titled Magic Moments, was released by EMI Australia.

In 2010, after eight years in production, Whitman released the album Twilight on the Trail. He was 87 years old at the time of its release. The album featured western standards such as Gene Autry's hit "Back in the Saddle Again" and the television theme song for The Roy Rogers and Dale Evans Show. 

Twilight on the Trail was produced by his son Byron Whitman and featured many well-known session musicians, including long-time band member Harold Bradley.

Personal life 
Whitman was married to Alma Geraldine "Jerry" Crist for 67 years, until her death in 2009. Jerry was born in Kansas, the daughter of church minister, A.D. Crist. The couple had two children, a daughter (Sharron, later Mrs. Beagle, born 1942), and a son (Byron Keith Whitman, born 1957). Byron, a performer and music producer, has released a number of recordings and toured and recorded with his father on numerous occasions.

From 1957 until his death, Whitman lived at his estate, Woodpecker Paradise, in Middleburg, Florida.  He was a longtime active member and deacon at Jacksonville Church of the Brethren.  A biography, “Mr. Songman: The Slim Whitman Story”, was written by Kenneth L. Gibble and published by Brethren Press in 1982.

False obituary and death
On January 20, 2008, on what was, coincidentally, Whitman's 85th birthday, a premature obituary believed to have been started by an erroneous report was published by the Nashville Tennessean newspaper and later picked up virally on the newspaper's website.

Slim Whitman died of heart failure on June 19, 2013, at age 90,  at Orange Park Medical Center in Orange Park, Florida. He is buried in the Middleburg Methodist Church Cemetery in Middleburg, Florida, next to his wife Jerry.

Legacy
For his contribution to the recording industry, Slim Whitman was given the accolade of a star on the Hollywood Walk of Fame at 1709 Vine Street.

George Harrison cited Whitman as an early influence: "The first person I ever saw playing a guitar was Slim Whitman, either a photo of him in a magazine or live on television. Guitars were definitely coming in." When a young Paul McCartney purchased his first guitar, the left-handed musician was unsure how to play an instrument that was manufactured and strung for a right-handed player. It was not until McCartney saw a picture of Whitman playing left-handed that he re-strung his guitar so that he too could play left-handed. American pop singer Michael Jackson cited Whitman as one of his ten favorite vocalists.

The 1996 film Mars Attacks! features Whitman's rendition of "Indian Love Call" as a weapon against Martian invaders (the song causes the Martians' heads to explode). In 2003, Rob Zombie used Whitman's version of "I Remember You" in his movie directorial debut in House of 1000 Corpses.

Discography

Studio albums

 Slim Whitman Sings and Yodels (1954)
 America's Favorite Folk Artist (1954)
 Slim Whitman Favorites  Country Hits, Volume 2 (1956)
 Slim Whitman Sings  Country Hits, Volume 1 (1957)
 Slim Whitman Sings  My Best to You (1958)
 Slim Whitman Sings  Country Favorites (1959)
 I'll Walk with God (1959)
 Slim Whitman Sings Million Record Hits  The Song of the Old Waterwheel (1960)
 Slim Whitman  Slim Whitman's First Visit to Britain  I'll Never Stop Loving You (1960)
 Just Call Me Lonesome  Portrait (1961)
 Once in a Lifetime  Cool Water (1961)
 Slim Whitman Sings Annie Laurie  Sweeter than the Flowers (1961)
 Forever (1962)
 Slim Whitman Sings  Anytime (1962)
 Heart Songs & Love Songs (1962)
 I'm a Lonely Wanderer (1963)
 Yodeling (1963)
 Irish Songs the Slim Whitman Way (1963)
 All-Time Favorites (1964)
 Country Songs / City Hits (1964)
 Love Song of the Waterfall (1965)
 Reminiscing (1965)
 More than Yesterday (More Country Songs & City Hits) (1965)
 God's Hand in Mine (1966)
 A Travelin' Man (1966)
 A Time for Love (1966)
 15th Anniversary Album (1967)
 Country Memories (1967)
 In Love the Whitman Way (1968)
 Happy Street (1968)
 Slim!  Straight from the Heart (1969)
 The Slim Whitman Christmas Album (1969)
 Tomorrow Never Comes (1970)
 Guess Who  Snowbird (1971)
 It's a Sin to Tell a Lie (1971)
 The Best of Slim Whitman (1972)
 I'll See You When (1973)
 Happy Anniversary (1974)
 Everything Leads Back to You (1975)
 Red River Valley (1976)
 Home on the Range (1977)
 Ghost Riders in the Sky (1978)
 Till We Meet Again (1980)
 Songs I Love to Sing (1980)
 Christmas with Slim Whitman (1980)
 Mr. Songman (1981)
 I'll Be Home for Christmas (1981)
 Angeline (1984)
 Magic Moments {with Byron Whitman)
 Twilight on the Trail (2010)

References

External links

 
 
 

1923 births
2013 deaths
20th-century American guitarists
20th-century American singers
20th-century American male singers
21st-century American guitarists
21st-century American male singers
21st-century American singers
American acoustic guitarists
American country guitarists
American country singer-songwriters
American folk guitarists
American male guitarists
American male singer-songwriters
United States Navy personnel of World War II
Country musicians from Florida
Grand Ole Opry members
Guitarists from Florida
Imperial Records artists
Musicians from Tampa, Florida
People from Middleburg, Florida
RCA Victor artists
Singer-songwriters from Florida
Singers with a three-octave vocal range
Writers from Tampa, Florida
Yodelers